The women's 5 km competition of the open water swimming events at the 2013 World Aquatics Championships was held on July 20.

Results
The final was started at 10:00.

References

Open water swimming at the 2013 World Aquatics Championships
World Aquatics Championships
2013 in women's swimming